Bilal El Megri (born 2 July 1995) is a Moroccan footballer  playing for DHJ as a winger.

References

1995 births
Living people
Moroccan footballers
Olympique Club de Khouribga players
Difaâ Hassani El Jadidi players
Botola players
People from Tétouan
Association football wingers